Miss Grand Kosovo is an annual Kosovan female beauty pageant founded in 2014 by a Pristina-based event organizer chaired by Sherif Pacolli, Lens Production. The pageant winner represents the country at its international parent contest, Miss Grand International. From 2014 to 2018, the pageant had been held in parallel with the Miss Grand Albania competition as Miss Grand Albania & Kosovo, but after Aleks Tanushi of Aleks Fashion Events (A.F.E.) took over the Albanian franchise in 2018, the pageant has been held as a stand-alone pageant during 2019–2021.

The contest was dissolved in 2022 after Pacolli lost the license to another national pageant chaired by Eduart Deda, Miss Universe Albania & Kosovo, in which one of the pageant runners-up was elected Miss Grand Kosovo. The national contest, which was previously defunct in 2012, "Miss Kosovo," was brought back by Pacolli as his replacement contest in 2022.

Since its first participation at the Miss Grand International pageant in 2014, Kosovo never got any placement at such an international contest.

History
Kosovo participated at the Miss Grand International for the first time in 2013 by the appointed representative Lirie Sejdija, a Pristina-based professional model. Later in 2014, after Lens Production, headed by Sherif Pacolli, acquired the license, the inaugural competition of the Miss Grand Kosovo pageant was finally happen, which the twenty-one years old Switzerland-based licensed practical nurse Naile Thaqi was announced the winner at a contest held at California Resort in the city of Lipljan on 20 July 2014, outclassing 19 other finalists. The event was broadcast nationwide by the local television channel named RTK Live. Since then, the contest was organized annually until 2021, when the license is no longer belonged to Pacolli. (Except for 2020, in which the titleholder was appointed to the position.) In 2022, the Kosovo's representative was elected through the Miss Universe Albania and Kosovo pageant, which was organized by Eduart Deda.

The contest was usually held at California Resort, located in Lipljan city, Pristina district of Kosovo, only the 2015 edition that was held in the head office of the First Channel. After Nikolla resignation, the organizers appointed their affiliated model, Songyl Meniqi, to join the contest in Myanmar instead.

Editions
The following list is the edition detail of the Miss Grand Kosovo contest, held annually from 2014 to 2021.

Representatives at Miss Grand International

References

External links
 

Miss Grand Kosovo
Kosovan awards
Recurring events established in 2014
2014 establishments in Kosovo